Sanhe is a town in  Yilong County in northeastern Sichuan province, China, located  northeast of the county seat. , it has one residential community and 20 villages under its administration.

References

Towns in Sichuan
Yilong County